The Aberdeenshire and District League, usually known as the Aberdeenshire League, is a football tournament for clubs in membership of the Aberdeenshire and District Football Association. The clubs are drawn from the historic counties of Aberdeenshire and Banffshire. Historically, clubs from Moray and Angus also competed.

The competition began in 1919 as the North Eastern League and renamed in 1921. It ran until the end of season 1952–53 when it was disbanded due to clubs' priorities being primarily on the Highland League.

The league was revived in 1994 as an Under-21 league. Currently, teams are allowed to field three over-age players in their match squad.

League Champions

Club Performance

References

External links
 Official website

Football leagues in Scotland
1919 establishments in Scotland
Sports leagues established in 1919
Football in Aberdeen
Football in Aberdeenshire
Football in Moray
Football in Angus, Scotland